"N 2 Deep" is a song by Canadian rapper Drake featuring American rapper Future. It was released on September 3, 2021 as the eighth track from Drake's sixth studio album Certified Lover Boy. The song sampled the song Get Throwed produced by producer Leroy Williams, Jr.

Charts

Weekly charts

Year-end charts

References

2021 songs
Drake (musician) songs
Songs written by Drake (musician)
Future (rapper) songs
Songs written by Future (rapper)
Trap music songs
Songs written by Jeezy
Songs written by 40 (record producer)
Songs written by Jay-Z
Songs written by Pimp C